The Nightmare Man is a science fiction drama serial transmitted by BBC Television in 1981. The four-part serial was adapted for television by Robert Holmes from the 1978 novel Child of Vodyanoi by David Wiltshire. It was produced by Ron Craddock (a former producer of Z-Cars) and directed by Douglas Camfield. Both Holmes and Camfield had worked extensively on Doctor Who.

The serial is set on a small Scottish island, where the population is gripped by fear following a series of savage murders and the discovery of a strange craft on the local beach.

Cast
Michael Gaffikin (James Warwick)
Described as a sassenach, being English, dentist Michael Gaffikin is a former Officer of the British Army's Parachute Regiment. He is a keen golfer and in love with the island's pharmacist.
Fiona Patterson (Celia Imrie)
Patterson is a pharmacist and also an illustrator and cartographer.
Dr Symonds (Tony Sibbald)
A Canadian bird-watcher visiting the island.
Inspector Inskip (Maurice Roëves)
A policeman from Glasgow, recently settled on the island .
Colonel Howard (Jonathan Newth)
A somewhat mysterious character, Colonel Howard arrives on the island at the start of the story.

Production

The serial was shot in and around the Cornish village of Port Isaac.  It was made entirely using outside broadcasting video facilities.

Release

The serial has been released on DVD (Region 2, UK) by BBC Worldwide as part of their Cult TV range. The DVD included a booklet detailing the serial's background and production.

External links

BBC television dramas
British science fiction television shows
Television shows based on British novels
1980s British drama television series
1981 British television series debuts
1981 British television series endings
English-language television shows
1980s British science fiction television series